Laodicea on the Lycus ( Laodikia pros tou Lykou; , also transliterated as Laodiceia or Laodikeia) (modern ) was an ancient city   in Asia Minor, now Turkey, on the river Lycus (Çürüksu). It was located in the Hellenistic regions of Caria and Lydia, which later became the Roman Province of Phrygia Pacatiana. It is now situated near the modern city of Denizli. 

Since 2002 archaeology has been continuing by Pamukkale University in Denizli followed by intensive restoration work.

In 2013 the archaeological site was inscribed in the Tentative List of World Heritage Sites in Turkey.

It contained one of the Seven churches of Asia mentioned in the Book of Revelation.

Location

Laodicea is situated on the long spur of a hill between the narrow valleys of the small rivers Asopus and Caprus, which discharge their waters into the Lycus.

It lay on a major trade route and in its neighbourhood were many important ancient cities; it was 17 km west of Colossae, 10 km south of Hierapolis. and 160 km east of Ephesus. It was situated in the ancient region of Phrygia, although some ancient authors place Laodicea in differing provincial territories, not surprising because the precise limits of these territories were both ill-defined and inconstant; for example, Ptolemy and Philostratus call it a town of Caria, while Stephanus of Byzantium describes it as belonging to Lydia.

History

The town was originally called Diospolis, "City of Zeus", and afterwards Rhodas. Excavations in the northern necropolis have shown that the settlement existed before the Hellenistic foundation and was inhabited by the native population. 

Laodicea was founded on the site of the older town by Antiochus II Theos, king of the Seleucid Empire, in 261-253 BC in honour of his wife Laodice, together with several other cities of the same name. Laodicea soon became quite wealthy. In 220 BC, Achaeus declared himself king of the region but was defeated by Antiochus the Great in 213 BC. Antiochus transported 2,000 Jewish families to Phrygia from Babylonia. Many of Laodicea's inhabitants were Jews from this time, and Cicero records that Flaccus later confiscated the considerable sum of 9 kg of gold which was being sent annually to Jerusalem for the Temple.  

After the Battle of Magnesia in 188 BC when the Romans defeated the Seleucids, the Treaty of Apamea was signed which gave control of the whole of western Asia Minor to the Kingdom of Pergamon. With the death of its last king, its territory was bequested to Rome in 133 BC. It received from Rome the title of free city. It suffered greatly during the Mithridatic Wars but quickly recovered under the dominion of Rome. Towards the end of the Roman Republic and under the first emperors, Laodicea benefitted from its advantageous position on a trade route and became one of the most important and flourishing commercial cities of Asia Minor, in which large money transactions and an extensive trade in black wool were carried out. Its renowned wealth is referred to in the Bible.

During the Roman period Laodicea was the chief city of a Roman conventus, which comprised 24 cities besides itself; Cicero records holding assizes there ca. 50 BC.

Strabo (64 BC - 24 AD) attributes the celebrity of the city to the fertility of the soil and the wealth of some of its inhabitants, amongst whom may have been Hiero of Laodicea, who adorned the city with many beautiful buildings and bequeathed to it more than 2000 talents at his death.

The wealth of its inhabitants engendered a taste for the arts of the Greeks, as is manifest from its ruins, and that it contributed to the advancement of science and literature is attested by the names of the sceptics Antiochus and Theiodas, the successors of Aenesidemus (1st century BC), and by the existence of a great medical school. Its wealthy citizens embellished Laodicea with beautiful monuments. One of the chief of these citizens, Polemon (r. 37 BC - 8 AD), became King of Armenian Pontus (called after him "Polemoniacus") and of the coast round Trebizond. The city minted its own coins, the inscriptions of which show evidence of the worship of Zeus, Æsculapius, Apollo, and the emperors.

The area often suffered from earthquakes, especially from the great shock that occurred in the reign of Nero (60 AD) in which the town was completely destroyed. But the inhabitants declined imperial assistance to rebuild the city and restored it from their own means. 

The martyrdom of Lulianos and Paphos is believed to have happened here.

The Byzantine writers often mention Laodicea, especially in the time of the Komnenian emperors. In 1119, Emperor John II Komnenos and his chief military commander, John Axouch, captured Laodicea from the Seljuk Turks in the first major military victory of his reign.

It was fortified by the emperor Manuel I Komnenos.  In 1206–1230, it was ruled by Manuel Maurozomes. The city was destroyed during the invasions of the Turks and Mongols.

Christianity at Laodicea

With its large Jewish community, Laodicea very early became a seat of Christianity and a bishopric. The Epistle to the Colossians mentions Laodicea as one of the communities of concern for Paul the Apostle. It sends greetings from a certain Epaphras from Colossae, who worked hard for the Christians of the three Phrygian cities of Colossae, Laodicea and Hierapolis. Asking for greetings to be sent to the Laodicean Christians, the writer requests that his letter be read publicly at Laodicea (Colossians 4:16) and that another letter addressed to the Laodiceans (see Epistle to the Laodiceans) be given a public reading at Colossae. Some Greek manuscripts of the First Epistle to Timothy end with the words: "Written at Laodicea, metropolis of Phrygia Pacatiana". Laodicea is also one of the seven churches of Asia mentioned in the Book of Revelation.

The first three bishops attributed to the see of Laodicea are very uncertain, their names recalling people mentioned in the New Testament: Archippus; Nymphas, already indicated as bishop of Laodicea by the Apostolic Constitutions of the last quarter of the 4th century (a man named Nymphas or, according to the best manuscripts, a woman named Nympha is mentioned in ); and Diotrephes. After these three comes Sagaris, martyr (c. 166). Sisinnius is mentioned in the Acts of the martyr Saint Artemon, a priest of his church. Nunechius assisted at the Council of Nicaea (325). Eugenius, known by an inscription, was probably his successor. The Arian Cecropius was transferred by Constantius to the See of Nicomedia.

When Phrygia was divided into two provinces, Laodicea became the metropolis of Phrygia Pacatiana: it figures under this title in all the Notitiae Episcopatuum. Some twenty incumbents are known besides those already enumerated; the last occupied the see in 1450. Since then, the bishopric has become a titular see, listed as Laodicea in Phrygia by the Catholic Church, which has appointed no further titular bishops to the see since the transfer of the last incumbent in 1968.

Sixty canons of a Council of Laodicea, written in Greek, exist. The testimony of Theodoret asserts this assembly was actually held, the date of this assembly being much discussed. Some have even thought that the council must have preceded that of Nicaea (325), or at least that of Constantinople (381). It seems safer to consider it as subsequent to the latter. The canons are, undoubtedly, only a resume of an older text, and indeed appear to be derived from two distinct collections. They are of great importance in the history of discipline and liturgy; some Protestants have invoked one of them in opposition to the veneration of angels.

The Site

The existing remains attest to its former greatness. Its many buildings include a stadium, baths, temples, a gymnasium, two theatres and a bouleuterion (Senate House). On the eastern side, the line of the ancient wall may be distinctly traced, with the remains of the Ephesus gate; there are streets traversing the town, flanked by colonnades and numerous pedestals. North of the town, towards the Lycus, are many sarcophagi, with their covers lying near them, partly embedded in the ground, and all having been long since rifled.

The West theatre has been recently restored (2022) with virtually complete banks of stone seats. Originally built in the Hellenistic period, it held 8000 spectators and was used until the 7th c. AD.

Also much of the vast 35,000 m2 west (or central) agora has been restored with many of its tall 10.8 m columns. The 100 m long and 11 m high back wall is covered with frescoes and is considered important for world archaeology. 

Particularly interesting are the remains of an aqueduct starting several km away at the Baspinar spring in Denizli, and possibly having another more distant source. Unusually, to cross the valley to the south of Laodicea, instead of the usual open channel carried above the level of the city on lofty arches as was the usual practice of the Romans, an inverted siphon was employed consisting of a double pressurised pipeline, descending into the valley and back up to the city. The water pressure in the siphon at the bottom of the valley was a challenge in the absence of strong piping. The low arches supporting the siphon commence near the summit of a low hill to the south of the city where the header tank was located, and thence continue to the first terminal distribution tank (castellum aquae) at the edge of the hill of the city, whose remains are visible to the east of the stadium and South Baths complex. The water was heavily charged with calcareous matter, as several of the arches are covered with a thick encrustation where leaks occurred at later times. The siphon consisted of large carved stone pipes; some of these also are much incrusted, and some completely choked up. The terminal tank has many clay pipes of various diameters for water distribution on the north, east and south sides which, because of the choking by sinter, were replaced in time. To the west of the terminal is a small fountain next to the vaulted gate. The aqueduct appears to have been destroyed by an earthquake, as the remaining arches lean bodily on one side, without being much broken. A second distribution terminal and sedimentation tank is visible 400 m north of the first, to which it was connected via another siphon of travertine blocks, and this one is bigger and supplied most of the city.

In 2015 a rare marble block was found with the inscription of the water law. Issued in 114 AD, it regulated use of water imported from the mountains to Laodicea on pain of 5 to 12.5 thousand denarii fines imposed for polluting water, destroying channels or opening water pipes.

The stadium near the southern extremity of the city is in a good state of preservation. The seats are arranged along two sides of a narrow valley, which was taken advantage of for this purpose, and was closed up at both ends. Towards the west are considerable remains of a subterranean passage, by which chariots and horses were admitted into the arena, with a long inscription over the entrance.

Immediately north of the stadium lies a complex of gymnasium coupled to twin baths peculiar to the region. It is linked to the south agora on its north side and also a bouleuterion. An inscription shows the ensemble was built for Hadrian's visit in 135.

It 2019 a statue of Roman emperor Trajan was unearthed at the site.

Notable people
 Polemon of Laodicea, a sophist
 Menander Rhetor, rhetorician
 Varus of Laodicea, a sophist
 Antiochus of Laodicea, philosopher
 Theiodas of Laodicea, philosopher
 Heras of Laodicea, fighter

Notes

External links

Hazlitt, Classical Gazetteer, "Laodicea"
Jewish Encyclopedia, "Laodicea" 

"HTML5 Panaoramas taken in December, 2012 Laodicea on the Lycus"
"Photos from the ancient ruins - Taken May 2015

Archaeological sites in the Aegean Region
Populated places in ancient Caria
Ancient Greek archaeological sites in Turkey
Seleucid colonies in Anatolia
Populated places in ancient Lydia
Populated places in Phrygia
Hellenistic Phrygia
Roman sites in Turkey
Catholic titular sees in Asia
New Testament cities
Former populated places in Turkey
History of Denizli Province
Buildings and structures in Denizli Province
Tourist attractions in Denizli Province
World Heritage Tentative List for Turkey